The 13e Régiment de Dragons Parachutistes or 13e RDP is a special reconnaissance regiment of the French Army. It is a unit of the French Army Special Forces Command, the latter itself being under the Special Operations Command. The regiment is based in Martignas-sur-Jalle.

Constituted in the form of a regiment of dragoons (mounted cavalry) during the Ancien Regime by the Marquis de Barbezières in Languedoc in 1676, this cavalry regiment, one of the oldest, adopted the appellation of 13e Régiment de dragons during the reorganization of the French cavalry units in 1791. The regiment was transformed into an armoured corps in 1936, then an airborne-capable reconnaissance unit in 1952.

Creation and lineage 
Like many regiments in European militaries of the 17th and 18th centuries the regiment often changed name to reflect its current commander or patron.

 1676, 4 October: formation of the regiment in Languedoc by the Marquis de Barbezières, as Dragoon de Barbezières.
 1714: designated as Dragoon de Goesbriand.
 1724, 12 December: designated as Dragoon de Condé.
 1744: designated as Dragoon de Bartillat
 1774: designated as Dragoon Comte-de-Provence, then, in the same year designated as  Dragoon de Monsieur.
 1791: designated as 13e Dragoon Regiment.
 1815: dissolution of the regiment after the Napoleonic wars.
 1855: Reformation of a Dragoon regiment designated as the Dragoon Regiment of the Empress in reference to The Empress Eugénie de Montijo.
 1870: re-designated as the 13e Dragoon Regiment.
 1936: Mechanized as an armoured regiment, receiving Somua and Hotchkiss tanks.
 1940: again disbanded, after losing 90% of its strength.
 1944: New formation
 1946: Regiment disbanded post-WW2
 1952: reorganization and re-trained as the 13e Parachute Dragoon Regiment.

Campaign history since 1792

History since 1945

Post–World War II 

After World War II the regiment was designated as a parachute unit in 1952 and witnessed yet another transformation. The regiment first integrated the 25th Parachute Division constituted in June 1956, following which the regiment was then transferred on July 1, 1957 to the 10th Parachute Division during the Algerian War. From May 1, 1963 to July 31, 1963, the regiment was part of the 11th Light Intervention Division 11e DLI.

The 13e RDP was transformed into a long-range recon unit. During the Cold War, the main mission of the 13e RDP was to provide intelligence for the 1st Army, while each company of the 1st Marine Infantry Parachute Regiment 1er RPIMa would provide intelligence for one Army Corps.

Since the end of the Cold War, the 1st Marine Infantry Parachute Regiment 1e RPIMa has become a direct-action unit while the 13e RDP specialized in reconnaissance/surveillance operations in hostile environment, gathering intelligence for special operations. In a way they're similar to the role of the U.S. Army Long Range Surveillance Detachment or Long Range Surveillance Company.

The 13e RDP took part in the Gulf War. This was highlighted when three operators were captured by the Iraqis in late 1990. The 13e RDP was, along with other French units, heavily involved in the Kosovo War and used tactics and technology to force Serbian armour to attempt to engage Kosovo Liberation Army and other Allied forces in the open, which enabled them to be destroyed by Allied bombing, particularly by the United States Air Force and the Royal Air Force. The 13e RDP also contributed to the capture of Momčilo Krajišnik in 2001 by close range recons.

Mission 
The mission for the regiment is to acquire human intelligence at any time and in any hostile environments (aquatic, cold mountain, equatorial forest, desert), behind enemy lines, using small autonomous and discreet units, able to position itself closer to acquire intelligence, and transmit. For this kind of mission, units of the 13th practice what they call "hideout", that is to say, operations camouflage living areas for observation and transmission, but also evolved into more modern and urban modes of action (installation of cameras / sensors and remote viewing). The regiment is officially in charge of the research of strategic intelligence.

The high skill level of 13e RDP operatives in special reconnaissance means that they are often requested by other forces. The Groupe d'Intervention de la Gendarmerie Nationale keeps a close relationship with the 13e RDP to train its gendarmes in forward recon for hostage rescue operations in hostile environments. The Équipes d'Observation en Profondeur (EOP, forward control teams) of French artillery regiments use the standard operating procedures of the 13e RDP. 13e RDP operators are also reported to be highly requested to join the Service Action of the Direction générale de la sécurité extérieure (D.G.S.E, French Intelligence Service).

13e RDP and Intelligence role 

In April 1960, the French Army in Germany decided to form an experimental long range intelligence company, the 7th company of Commandos, based on earlier work in Indochina and Algeria. The 7th company developed survival and reconnaissance procedures for operating behind enemy lines. These methods and procedures and personnel are absorbed by the 13e RDP. This led to the 13e RDP from 1963 being formally tasked with its current 'Long Range Reconnaissance Patrol' missions.

Finally in 1968, the French Army laid out a plan for conversion of the regiment completely to its new task. Pending the creation of the new 1st Army in 1972, EMA decided to implement this plan, restructuring the regiment. The 13e RDP is then made available to the Army to be used in Germany in a stay-behind role in case of war.

The Regiment was initially subordinate to the BRGE (French Army's military intelligence and electronic warfare Brigade). Nowadays, the 13e RDP is part of the French Special Operations Command

Organization 
The Regiment is currently composed of seven squadrons:
 Four "search", or intelligence, squadrons. They provide the Regiment's recon teams.
 One long-range communications squadron. They provide a secure communications link between deployed recon teams and higher headquarters.
 One exploitation squadron.
 One training squadron. They are responsible for providing in-house training courses and certifying new unit members.

Equipment 
13e RDP is equipped with standard French Army material, but has access to specialized weapons and equipment when needed. In the event that a "silenced" weapon is required teams can be equipped with MP5SD submachine guns. When heavy fire power is considered necessary, recon teams are known to carry the M-203 40 mm grenade launcher, and the 5.56mm Minimi LMG. Vehicle mounted teams may arm their vehicles with a variety of heavy weapons including Browning .50 cal heavy machine guns, US MK-19 40 mm automatic grenade launchers, and light machine guns.

The vehicle-mounted teams are equipped with Panhard VPSs, heavily armed P-4 Jeeps and Peugeot motorcycles.

Training 
Each member of the 13e RDP are trained in the hand-to-hand combat system of Techniques of Close Operational Interventions which is a mix of Krav Maga & boxing

Traditions

Motto 
The motto of the 13e RDP, is Au-delà du possible ("Beyond the possible").

Insignia

Regimental Colors

Honours

Battle honours 
 Valmy 1792
 Hohenlinden 1800
 Austerlitz 1805
 Iéna 1806
 La Moskowa 1812
 Ypres 1914
 Verdun 1916
 AFN 1952–1962

Decorations 
The regimental colours of the 13th Parachute Dragoon Regiment are decorated with:

 Croix de guerre 1939–1945 with 1 palm.
 Croix de la Valeur militaire with 3 palms.
 Gold Medal of the City of Milan

See also 
 List of French paratrooper units

References

External links 
  13e RDP official site 
  13e RDP official Facebook webpage 
 Official site of the 13th Regiment veterans 

20th-century regiments of France
21st-century regiments of France
Dragoon regiments of France
Military units and formations established in 1954
Parachute regiments of France
Special forces of France
Military units and formations established in 1791